KXST (1140 AM) is a commercial radio station licensed to North Las Vegas, Nevada, and broadcasting to the Las Vegas metropolitan area. The station is owned by Audacy, Inc., but is currently silent.

KXST's transmitter is near Nellis Air Force Base and Interstate 15, on East Tropical Parkway; the sale of the site is a factor in the station's current silence.  It was powered at 10,000 watts by day, using a non-directional antenna.  Because AM 1140 is a clear channel frequency reserved for XEMR in Monterrey, Mexico, and WRVA in Richmond, Virginia, KXST reduced its power to 2,500 watts and used a directional antenna at night.

History

First years on 1050 AM
In 1956, the station first signed on as KRBO.  It was owned by Rainbow, Incorporated, hence the call sign.  The station's original city of license was Las Vegas, and it broadcast on 1050 kHz.  Because there is a Class I-A station on 1050, XEG in Monterrey, Mexico, then powered at 150,000 watts, KRBO was limited to only 250 watts and was a daytimer, required to be off the air at sunset.

Move to 1140 AM, subsequent formats
The station was acquired by Meyer Gold, who relocated the studios to the New Frontier Hotel and Casino, changing the call letters to KLUC, for "Luck".  Gold was able to get the Federal Communications Commission to allow a move to 1140 kHz in the late 1960s.  That was coupled with a boost to 1,000 watts and eventual full-time broadcasting.

In the past, AM 1140 ran a variety of formats, including adult contemporary in the 1970s and mid-1980s as KMJJ, heavy metal The Crusher from 1987 to 1990, and then an AM simulcast of co-owned KLUC-FM. In 1993, the station switched to a tourist information service branded as KXNO Casino Radio, which carried a loop of advertising for shows, casinos and hotels in Las Vegas.

Sports and Hot Talk
In 1996, the station was acquired by American Radio Systems, and flipped to sports talk radio as KSFN The Fan, featuring play-by-play of UNLV Rebels college basketball, Arizona Diamondbacks baseball, and Oakland Raiders football. The station was not very popular, failing to register on Arbitron ratings. In 1999, KSFN flipped to an oldies format branded as Crusin' Oldies, with a focus on music from the late-1950s and early 1960s, primarily targeting the region's baby boomer demographic.

In 2001, KSFN flipped to a talk format as Hot Talk 1140, with a lineup featuring programs including Tom Leykis, Phil Hendrie, and Opie & Anthony. In January 2005, the station re-branded as Spike 1140 AM, a brand extension of the then co-owned, male-oriented cable channel Spike. The station added sports programming, including an affiliation with Sporting News Radio.  It also began carrying Los Angeles Dodgers baseball (the team claims southern Nevada within its territory).

Back to Sports
On April 14, 2008, KSFN returned to an all-sports format.  It dropped Leykis, and did not pick up the Mike O'Meara Show after the retirement of Don Geronimo from the Don and Mike Show. At the same time, the station added Dan Patrick and expanded programming from Sporting News Radio while retaining Opie & Anthony and the Dodgers. The new format also included local personalities Casey Freelove and Corey Olson hosting "Freelove and Olson" weeknights 7-9pm and Saturdays 1-4pm.

Beginning in August 2008, KSFN also gained the rights to be the official Las Vegas station for USC Trojans football in Las Vegas and began carrying the Sports USA Radio Network NFL doubleheader.

KYDZ Radio, return to Sports
On March 2, 2009, the station changed its call letters to KYDZ and flipped to a children's radio format branded as Kydz Radio, focusing on teen pop and other songs oriented towards tweens.  On January 2, 2013, KYDZ returned to sports talk as an owned-and-operated outlet of the newly established CBS Sports Radio Network.

Entercom/Audacy ownership
On February 2, 2017, CBS Radio announced it would merge with Entercom. The merger was approved on November 9, 2017, and was consummated on the 17th.

In August 2017, a reporter from KLAS-TV obtained an internal e-mail that instructed all of CBS's radio stations in Las Vegas, including KXST, to not cover or otherwise acknowledge the city's new National Hockey League team, the Vegas Golden Knights, on any platform as retaliation for having been outbid by competitor KRLV for rights to be the team's flagship radio station. Following the reports, CBS Radio Las Vegas senior vice president Tony Perlongo apologized to the team and told The Washington Post that he had reversed the policy, stating that it was an "error in judgement on our part", and that CBS Radio would "cover the team, first and foremost on Sports Radio 1140 and on our music and news/talk stations as it makes sense for those formats and audiences."

On June 21, 2021, KXST changed their format from CBS Sports Radio to sports gambling, branded as "The Bet Las Vegas", with programming from the BetQL Network. CBS Sports Radio programming remained in non-prime timeslots to fulfill contractual minimums.

Sign off

On February 13, 2023, Audacy announced that KXST would be signing off on March 1, 2023. In November 2022, Audacy sold the land that the AM transmitter sat on for $40 million in an area currently being developed for industrial warehouse uses; KXST is diplexed with KDWN near the Las Vegas Motor Speedway. KXST's BetQL schedule was simulcast on KLUC-HD2, and that station continues to carry the network.  Both KXST and KDWN signed off at midnight on February 28, 2023.

References

External links
FCC History Cards for KXST

XST
Radio stations established in 1956
XST
Sports radio stations in the United States
1956 establishments in Nevada
Audacy, Inc. radio stations
CBS Sports Radio stations